Mixtures of milk and meat are forbidden according to Jewish law. This dietary law, basic to kashrut, is based on two verses in the Book of Exodus, which forbid "boiling a (goat) kid in its mother's milk" and a third repetition of this prohibition in Deuteronomy.

Explanations for the law
The rabbis of the Talmud gave no reason for the prohibition, but later authorities, such as Maimonides, opined that the law was connected to a prohibition of idolatry in Judaism. Obadiah Sforno and Solomon Luntschitz, rabbinic commentators living in the late Middle Ages, both suggested that the law referred to a specific foreign [Canaanite] religious practice, in which young goats were cooked in their own mothers' milk, aiming to obtain supernatural assistance to increase the yield of their flocks. More recently, a theogonous text named the birth of the gracious gods, found during the rediscovery of Ugarit, has been interpreted as saying that a Levantine ritual to ensure agricultural fertility involved the cooking of a young goat in its mother's milk, followed by the mixture being sprinkled upon the fields, though still more recent sources argue that this translation is incorrect.

Some rabbinic commentators saw the law as having an ethical aspect. Rashbam argued that using the milk of an animal to cook its offspring was inhumane, based on a principle similar to that of Shiluach haken. Chaim ibn Attar compared the practice of cooking animals in their mother's milk to the slaying of nursing infants.

In 2008, it was theorized that the proscription against combining milk and meat had its origins in the practice of using clay vessels for food storage and preparation. The porous walls of clay jars retained bacteria that functioned as a starter culture to produce yogurt. However, using such a jar to store or prepare meat would turn it sour, thereby ruining it.

The Biblical law as understood by the rabbis

Three distinct laws
The Talmudic rabbis believed that the biblical text only forbade cooking a mixture of milk and meat, but because the biblical regulation is triplicated they imposed three distinct regulations to represent it:
not cooking meat and milk together (regardless of whether the result was eaten)
not eating milk and meat together (regardless of whether it was cooked together)
not benefiting from the mixture in any other way

Jacob ben Asher, an influential medieval rabbi, remarked that the gematria of do not boil a kid (Hebrew: לא תבשל גדי) is identical to that of it is the prohibition of eating, cooking and deriving benefit (Hebrew: ובישול והנאה), a detail that he considered highly significant. Though deriving benefit is a superficially vague term, it was later interpreted by medieval writers to include:
Serving mixtures of milk and meat in a restaurant, even if the clientele are non-Jewish, and the restaurant is not intended to comply with kashrut
Feeding a pet with food containing mixtures of milk and meat
Obtaining a refund for an accidental purchase of mixtures of milk and meat, as a refund constitutes a form of sale

The classical rabbis only considered milk and meat cooked together biblically forbidden, but Jewish writers of the Middle Ages also forbade consumption of anything merely containing the mixed tastes of milk and meat. This included, for example, meat that had been soaked in milk for an extended period. The prohibition against deriving benefit, on the other hand, was seen as being more nuanced, with several early modern authorities (including Moses Isserles and Taz) arguing that this restriction only applied to the milk and meat of g'di, not to the much wider range of milks and meats prohibited by the rabbis; other prominent medieval rabbis, like Solomon Luria, disagreed, believing that the prohibition of deriving benefit referred to mixtures of all meats and milks.

The term "g'di"
The Book of Genesis refers to young goats by the Hebrew phrase g'di izim, but the prohibition against boiling a kid... only uses the term g'di (גדי). Rashi, one of the most prominent talmudic commentators, argued that the term g'di must actually have a more general meaning, including calves and lambs, in addition to young goats. Rashi also argued that the meaning of g'di is still narrow enough to exclude birds, all the undomesticated kosher animals (for example, chevrotains and antelope), and all of the non-kosher animals. The Talmudic writers had a similar analysis, but believed that since domesticated kosher animals (sheep, goats, and cattle) have similar meat to birds and to the non-domestic kosher land-animals, they should prohibit these latter meats too, creating a general prohibition against mixing milk and meat from any kosher animal, excepting fish.

Consumption of non-kosher animals (e.g., pigs, camels, and turtles) is prohibited in general, and questions about the status of mixtures involving their meat and milk would be somewhat academic. Nevertheless, the lack of a classical decision about milk and meat of non-kosher animals gave rise to argument in the late Middle Ages. Some, such as Yoel Sirkis and Joshua Falk, argued that mixing milk and meat from non-kosher animals should be prohibited, but others, like Shabbatai ben Meir and David HaLevi Segal, argued that, excluding the general ban on non-kosher animals, such mixtures should not be prohibited.

The term "halev immo"

Rashi expressed the opinion that the reference to mother's milk must exclude fowl from the regulation, since only mammals produce milk. According to Shabbethai Bass, Rashi was expressing the opinion that the reference to a mother was only present to ensure that birds were clearly excluded from the prohibition; Bass argued that Rashi regarded the ban on boiling meat in its mother's milk to really be a more general ban on boiling meat in milk, regardless of the relationship between the source of the meat and that of the milk.

Substances derived from milk, such as cheese and whey, have traditionally been considered to fall under the prohibition, but milk substitutes, created from non-dairy sources, do not. However, the classical rabbis were worried that Jews using artificial milk might be misinterpreted, so they insisted that the milk be clearly marked to indicate its source. In the classical era, the main form of artificial milk was almond milk, so the classical rabbis imposed the rule that almonds must be placed around such milk; in the Middle Ages, there was some debate about whether this had to be done during cooking as well as eating, or whether it was sufficient to merely do this during the meal.

The term "bishul"

Although the biblical regulation literally only mentions boiling (Hebrew: bishul, בישול), there were questions raised in the late Middle Ages about whether this should instead be translated as cooking, and hence be interpreted as a reference to activities like broiling, baking, roasting, and frying. Lenient figures like Jacob of Lissa and Chaim ibn Attar argued that such a prohibition would only be a rabbinic addition, and not the biblical intent, but others like Abraham Danzig and Hezekiah da Silva argued that the biblical term itself had this wider meaning.

Though radiative cooking of meat with dairy produce is not listed by the classical rabbis as being among the biblically prohibited forms of cooking such mixtures, a controversy remains about using a microwave oven to cook these mixtures.

Rabbinic additions to the Biblical law
The classical rabbis interpreted  to mean that they should (metaphorically) create a protective fence around the biblical laws, and this was one of the three principle teachings of the Great Assembly. Mixing of milk and meat is one area of halacha where a particularly large number of "fences" have been added. Nevertheless, the rabbis of the classical and Middle Ages also introduced a number of leniencies.

Minuscule quantities 

Many rabbis followed the premise that "taste is principle": in the event of an accidental mixing of milk and meat, the food could be eaten if there was no detectable change in taste. Others argued that forbidden ingredients could constitute up to half of the mixture before being disallowed.

Due to the premise that "taste is principle",  (i.e. 'neutral') foods are considered to take on the same "meat/dairy produce" classification as anything they are cooked with.

Physical proximity
Prominent rabbis of the Middle Ages insisted that milk should not be placed on a table where people are eating meat, to avoid accidentally consuming milk while eating meat, and vice versa. Tzvi Hirsch Spira, an early 20th-century rabbi, argued that when this rule was created, the tables commonly in use were only large enough for one individual; Spira concludes that the rule would not apply if the table being used was large, and the milk was out of reach of the person eating meat (and vice versa).

The rabbis of the Middle Ages discussed the issue of people eating milk and meat at the same table. Jacob ben Asher suggested that each individual should eat from different tablecloths, while Moses Isserles argued that a large and obviously unusual item should be placed between the individuals, as a reminder to avoid sharing the foods. Later rabbinic writers pointed out exceptions to the rule. Chaim ibn Attar, an 18th-century kabbalist, ruled that sitting at the same table as a non-Jew eating non-kosher food was permissible; Yechiel Michel Epstein, a 19th-century rabbi, argued that the risk was sufficiently reduced if individuals sat far enough apart that the only way to share food was to leave the table.

Classification of foods
To prevent the consumption of forbidden mixtures, foods are divided into three categories.
 "meat" (North America) or "meaty" (UK)
 "dairy" (North America) or "milky" (UK)

Food in the  category includes fish, fruit, vegetables, salt, etc.; among the Karaites and Ethiopian Jews it also includes poultry.  The Talmud states that the Biblical prohibition applies only to meat and milk of domesticated kosher mammals; that is, cattle, goats, and sheep.  It adds that according to the view of Rabbi Akiva, the Rabbis instituted a protective decree extending the law to the meat and milk of wild kosher mammals, such as deer, as well as the meat of kosher poultry, such as chickens.  The  follows this approach. 

Classical Jewish authorities argue that foods lose  status if treated in such a way that they absorb the taste of milk or meat during cooking, soaking, or salting.

Dishes and cooking utensils  

Since some cooking vessels and utensils (such as ceramic, metal, plastic and wooden materials) are porous, it is possible for them to become infused with the taste of certain foods and transfer this taste to other foods. For example, if a frying pan is used to fry beef sausage, and is then used a few hours later to fry an omelette with cheese, a slight taste of the sausage might linger.

Samuel ben Meir, brother of Jacob ben Meir, argued that infused tastes could endure in a cooking vessel or utensil for up to 24 hours; his suggestion led to the principle, known as ben yomo (Hebrew: son of the day, בן יומו), that vessels and utensils should not be used to cook milk within 24 hours of being used to cook meat (and vice versa). Although, after 24 hours, some residual flavour may still reside in porous cooking vessels and utensils, some rabbis hold the opinion that such residue would become stale and fetid, hence only infusing taste for the worse (Hebrew: nosen taam lifgam, נותן טעם לפגם), which they do not regard as violating the ban against mixing the tastes of milk and meat.

Since parve food is reclassified if it takes on the flavour of meat or dairy produce, Ashkenazi Jews traditionally forbid eating parve contents of a pot that has been used within 24 hours to cook meat, if the parve contents would be eaten with dairy produce. Their tradition similarly forbids eating parve foods with meat if the cooking vessel was used to cook dairy produce within the previous 24 hours. According to Joseph Caro, the Sephardic tradition was more lenient about such things, but Moses Isserles argued that such leniency was unreliable.

In light of these issues, kashrut-observant Jews can take the precaution of maintaining two distinct sets of crockery and cutlery; one set (known in Yiddish as milchig and in Hebrew as halavi) is for food containing dairy produce, while the other (known in Yiddish as fleishig/fleishedik and in Hebrew as besari) is for food containing meat.

Shelomo Dov Goitein writes, “the dichotomy of the kitchen into a meat and a milk section, so basic in an observant Jewish household, is … never mentioned in the Geniza." Goitein believed that in the early Middle Ages Jewish families kept only one set of cutlery and cooking ware. According to David C. Kraemer the practice of keeping separate sets of dishes developed only in the late 14th or 15th centuries. In earlier times, the household's one set of cooking ware was kashered between dairy and meat (and vice versa). Alternatively, users waited overnight for the meat or dairy gravy absorbed in a pot’s walls to become insignificant (lifgam) before using the pot for the other species (meat or dairy).

Problem of sequential foods 
Rashi stated that meat leaves a fatty residue in the throat and on the palate and Maimonides noted that meat stuck between the teeth might not degrade for several hours. Feivel Cohen maintained that hard cheese leaves a lingering taste in the mouth. Generally, rabbinic literature considers the collective impact of each of these issues.

Eating dairy after meat
The Talmud reports that Mar Ukva, a respected rabbi, would not eat dairy after eating meat at the same meal, and had a father who would wait an entire day after eating meat before eating dairy produce. Jacob ben Meir speculated that Mar Ukva's behaviour was merely a personal choice, rather than an example he expected others to follow, but prominent rabbis of the Middle Ages argued that Mar Ukva's practice must be treated as a minimum standard of behaviour.

Maimonides argued that time was required between meat and dairy produce because meat can become stuck in the teeth, a problem he suggested would last for about six hours after eating it; this interpretation was shared by Solomon ben Aderet, a prominent pupil of his, and Asher ben Jehiel, who gained entry to the rabbinate by Solomon ben Aderet's approval, as well as by the later Shulchan Aruch. By contrast, tosafists argued that the key detail was just the avoidance of dairy produce appearing at the same meal as meat. Therefore, it was sufficient to just wait until a new meal—which to them simply meant clearing the table, reciting a particular blessing, and cleaning their mouths. Some later rabbinic writers, like Moses Isserles, and significant texts, like the Zohar (as noted by Vilna Gaon and Daniel Josiah Pinto), argued that a meal still did not qualify as new unless at least an hour had passed since the previous meal.

Since most Orthodox Sephardi Jews consider the Shulchan Aruch authoritative, they regard its suggestion of waiting six hours mandatory. Ashkenazi Jews, however, have various customs. Orthodox Jews of Eastern European background who follow Minhag Polin usually wait for six hours, although those of German ancestry who follow Minhag Ashkenaz traditionally wait for only three hours, and those of Dutch ancestry have a tradition of waiting only for the one hour. The medieval tosafists stated that the practice does not apply to infants, but 18th and 19th-century rabbis, such as Abraham Danzig and Yechiel Michel Epstein, criticised those who followed lenient practices that were not traditional in their region. In the 20th century, many rabbis were in favor of leniency. Moses Stern ruled that all young children were excluded from these strictures, Obadiah Joseph made an exception for the ill, and Joseph Chaim Sonnenfeld exempted nursing women.

Eating meat after dairy 
It has traditionally been considered less problematic to eat dairy products before meat, on the assumption that dairy products leave neither fatty residue in the throat, nor fragments between the teeth. Many 20th century Orthodox rabbis say that washing the mouth out between eating dairy and meat is sufficient. Some argue that there should also be recitation of a closing blessing before the meat is eaten, and others view this as unnecessary. Ashkenazi Jews following kabbalistic traditions, based on the Zohar, additionally ensure that about half an hour passes after consuming dairy produce before eating meat.

Some rabbis of the Middle Ages argued that after eating solid dairy products such as cheese, the hands should be washed. Shabbatai ben Meir even argues that this is necessary if utensils such as forks were used and the cheese never touched by hands. Other rabbis of that time, like Joseph Caro, thought that if it was possible to visually verify that hands were clean, then they need not be washed; Tzvi Hirsch Spira argued that washing the hands should also be practiced for milk.

Jacob ben Asher thought that washing the mouth was not sufficient to remove all residue of cheese, and suggested that eating some additional solid food is required to clean the mouth. Hard and aged cheese has long been rabbinically considered to need extra precaution, on the basis that it might have a much stronger and longer lasting taste; the risk of it leaving a fattier residue has more recently been raised as a concern. According to these rabbinic opinions, the same precautions (including a pause of up to six hours) apply to eating hard cheese before meat as apply to eating meat in a meal when the meat is eaten first. Judah ben Simeon, a 17th-century physician in Frankfurt, argued that hard cheese is not problematic if melted. Binyomin Forst argues that leniency is proper only for cooked cheese dishes and not dishes topped with cheese.

Non-Rabbinic movements
The Karaites, completely rejecting the Talmud, where the stringency of the law is strongest, have few qualms about the general mixing of meat and milk.  It is only the cooking of an animal in the milk of its actual mother that is banned.

While it is generally banned for the Beta Israel community of Ethiopia to prepare general mixtures of meat and milk, poultry is not included in this prohibition. However, since the movement of almost the entire Beta Israel community to Israel in the 1990s, the community has generally abandoned its old traditions and adopted the broad meat and milk ban followed by Rabbinical Judaism.

Samaritanism
In , the Samaritan Pentateuch adds the following passage after the prohibition: [כי עשה זאת כזבח שכח ועברה היא לאלהי יעקב] which translates, "For he who does such as that is like a forbidden offering. And this is a transgression to God of Jacob".

Effects in Jewish cuisine
These restrictions remove certain dishes from Jewish cuisine, and induce alterations in others.
For example, while the Arab shawarma has lamb or beef with a yogurt sauce, in Israel, most shawarma is made with dark meat turkey and is commonly served with tahini sauce.

Another effect is Jewish American Chinese restaurant patronage, specially among New York Jews, who can choose among several Chinese restaurants that follow kosher rules.

See also
 Kil'ayim, other forbidden mixtures in Jewish law

References

External links
 Milk and meat in the Torah and the Code of Maimonides (Mishneh Torah)
 Eran Viezel, and Nir Avieli, ‘Why Are Jews Forbidden to Eat Meat and Milk Together? The Function of Eating Restrictions in Human Societies,’ Journal of Theological Studies 72 (2021), pp. 580-619

Kashrut
Negative Mitzvoth
Milk
Kosher dairy
Kosher meat